Sarma Bala Vrudhula is a Professor of Computer Science and Engineering at Arizona State University, Tempe, Arizona. He was named Fellow of the Institute of Electrical and Electronics Engineers (IEEE) in 2016 for contributions to low-power and energy-efficient design of digital circuits and systems.

Education
 Ph.D., Electrical and Computer Engineering, University of Southern California, 1985
 M.S., Electrical Engineering, University of Southern California, 1980
 B.Math., University of Waterloo, Ontario, Canada, 1976

References

External links
 

20th-century births
Living people
American computer scientists
American electrical engineers
USC Viterbi School of Engineering alumni
University of Waterloo alumni
Arizona State University faculty
Fellow Members of the IEEE
Year of birth missing (living people)
Place of birth missing (living people)